Gephyromantis enki, commonly known as the Ambatolahy Madagascar frog, is a species of frog in the family Mantellidae.  It is endemic to Madagascar.  Its natural habitats are subtropical or tropical moist lowland forests, subtropical or tropical moist montane forests, and heavily degraded former forest. They are known for their light greenish yellow skin.

References

enki
Endemic fauna of Madagascar
Taxonomy articles created by Polbot
Amphibians described in 2002